Mark R. Dybul (born September 23, 1963) is an American diplomat, physician and medical researcher. He served as the executive director of the Global Fund to Fight AIDS, Tuberculosis and Malaria from 2012 until 2017. Since 2021, he has been the CEO of Enochian Biosciences.

Biography

Early life and education
Mark Dybul was born September 23, 1963. He received his A.B. (1985) and M.D. (1992) from Georgetown University and completed his residency in internal medicine at the University of Chicago Hospitals (1995) and a fellowship in infectious diseases at the National Institute of Allergy and Infectious Diseases (1998).

Medical and clinical research
Dybul's scientific and clinical research interests have covered the fields of molecular biology, microbiology, virology, pharmacology and especially infectious diseases. He and his colleagues have published in these fields, and he has spoken at medical conferences in infectious diseases.

Career
Dybul started his career by working with AIDS patients in San Francisco, California. Under the presidency of George W. Bush, he was appointed as the United States Global AIDS Coordinator, leading the implementation of the President's Emergency Plan for AIDS Relief from 2006 to 2009. However, he is a registered Independent. He is the first out gay ambassador with the rank of Assistant Secretary of State.

Dybul was asked to stay on temporarily during the Barack Obama presidency transition, but was required to resign following the administration change, as he was a political appointee of the Bush administration. On November 15, 2012, he was appointed the next executive director of the Global Fund to Fight AIDS, Tuberculosis and Malaria. His selection as executive director by the Global Fund's board during its 28th meeting in Geneva was met with praise from both donors and the development community. World Bank President Jim Yong Kim called Dybul's appointment a "superb choice for a crucial role". In an interview published in the Global Fund's digital newsletter, Dybul said his role as the Global Fund's new head "will be to maintain the strong forward trajectory of the Fund in order to end the three diseases". He assumed his role of head of the Global Fund in February 2013.

Dybul is a professor in the department of Mmedicine at the Medical Center of Georgetown University and the codirector of the Center for Global Health Practice and Impact. He is a member of the Global Health Initiative faculty committee. From 2020 until 2022, Dybul served as a member of the Independent Panel for Pandemic Preparedness and Response, a group examining how the World Health Organization and countries handled the COVID-19 pandemic, co-chaired by Helen Clark and Ellen Johnson Sirleaf. In the preparations for the Global Health Summit hosted by the European Commission and the G20 in May 2021, he was a member of the event's High Level Scientific Panel.

Dybul has been an executive vice-chairman of Enochian Biosciences, a US biotechnology company, since 2019, before being appointed as its CEO in 2021.

Philanthropy
Dybul serves on the boards of the Clinton Health Access Initiative, IAVI, Big Win Philanthropy, the Elton John AIDS Foundation, Global Health Corps, and Enochian Biosciences.

Personal life
Dybul is openly gay and married to Jason Claire.

References

External links

1963 births
Living people
Georgetown University alumni
Georgetown University School of Medicine alumni
American physicians
Ambassadors of the United States
American civil servants
Gay diplomats
LGBT ambassadors of the United States
LGBT appointed officials in the United States
United States Department of State officials
Members of the National Academy of Medicine